Rustmästare is a former Swedish rank that literally means the one responsible for the armory.

History and related ranks

Origin 1600 
Rustmästare was originally an underofficer rank and the holder of the rank was responsible for the care of the armory, weaponry and ammunition within a company.

1833/87
Holders of the rank were elevated to Furir.

1957
The rank was reintroduced as the highest rank within the Underbefäls category.

1972
The rank of rustmästare was replaced with fanjunkare, and the rank was removed.

Reform 1972 
Prior to 1972, military personnel were divided into three categories Underbefäl (non-commissioned officers), Underofficerare (warrant officers) and Officerare (commissioned officers). 

The Underbefäl category was split into two categories 
 gruppbefäl, for national servicemen, to include: 
 korpral - former vicekorpral 
 furir - former korpral
 överfurir - former furir
 plutonsofficerare to include
 sergeant - former överfurir
 fanjunkare - former överfurir and rustmästare
The Underofficer category was renamed kompaniofficerare to include:
 fänrik - former sergeant and fanjunkare with less than 3 years of service
 löjtnant - former sergeant and fanjunkare with 3-7 years of service
 kapten - former sergeant, fanjunkare with a minimum of 7 years of service and förvaltare 
The Officer category was renamed regementsofficerare to include 
 löjtnant - Löjtnant with less than 3 years of service and former fänrik 
 kapten - kapten with less than 11 years of service and former Löjtnant with 3-11 years of service
 major - former kapten and löjtnant with a minimum of 11 years of service
 överstelöjtnant - överstelöjtnant and former major 
 higher ranks

Reform 1983  
All categories were merged into one professional officer category with the lowest rank set to fänrik. Furir, överfurir, sergeant and fanjunkare were removed as a professional ranks. Holders of the rank fanjunkare were given the rank of löjtnant and the rest to fänrik.

See also
 Military ranks of the Swedish armed forces
 Swedish Armed Forces

References

Military ranks of the Swedish Army